{{Infobox musical artist  
| name                = 

 is a Japanese vocal group consisting of DJ Ozma and the owarai group Tunnels in character and in drag depicting a group of women they found scouting for talent in Las Vegas, Nevada. The group is on the Avex label.

Members
 The 36-year-old matriarch of the Yazima family portrayed by  worked as a nude dancer in Las Vegas before being "discovered" by DJ Ozma and the Tunnels. She has been working as a dancer since she was 19.
 The blond 18-year-old (originally 17-year-old) daughter of the Yazima family portrayed by DJ Ozma who reluctantly worked with her mother as a dancer before being "discovered" by DJ Ozma and the Tunnels. She "mastered" the Japanese language soon within her "arrival" in Japan, unlike her mother.
 The 12-year-old (originally 11-year-old) daughter of the Yazima family portrayed by  who constantly seeks out her father by calling out . She is the only flat-chested member of the group due to her "age" but has extensive armpit hair and wears her hair in an afro.

Discography

Singles 
 - October 29, 2008
The group's debut single peaked at #3 on the Oricon Weekly Charts and subsequently was certified as a gold record by the Recording Industry Association of Japan in November. The song went on to become the #2 requested song in karaoke parlors for 2008, between Shuchishin's debut single at #1 and GReeeeN's "Kiseki" at #3. The song was also used in a commercial for Lotte's SPASH chewing gum and it ranked as the #3 best song to appear in a commercial, after Orange Range's "Oshare Banchou feat. Soy Sauce" for Glico's Pocky at #1 and Arashi's "Boku ga Boku no Subete" for KDDI's au BOX. The song is also included in the "Nanairo no Nico Nico Douga" medley.
 The single sold over 140,000 copies.
 - March 25, 2009
The highest "SAKURA -Haru o Uta wa Nevada-" reached on the Oricon was #5 for the weekly rankings. It reached #14 for April 2009's monthly rankings. The song is akin to other sakura-themed songs released in Japan during the time of the trees' blooming.
 So far the single has sold 34,179 copies.
 - July 8, 2009
This new single was advertised as a summertime hit, singing about the beach and other summer activities.
The single was ranked as #9 on the weekly Oricon chart and has sold a total of 25,116 copies.
 - February 10, 2010
The song is performed in a disco style. On the cover, the three members appear as golden Liberties.
Peaking at #12, the single sold 9,012 copies according to the Oricon chart.
 - April 21, 2010
"Idol Mitai ni Utawasete"
"Idol Mitai ni Utawasete (KARAOKE)"
"Idol Mitai ni Utawasete
"Idol Mitai ni Utawasete (Margaret de Utaou! ver.)"
"Idol Mitai ni Utawasete (Strawberry de Utaou! ver.)"
"Idol Mitai ni Utawasete (Naomi de Utaou! ver.)"
"Idol Mitai ni Utawasete (Yazima Beauty Salon de Utaou! ver.)"

Albums 

 - March 3, 2010
CD
"Nihon no Mikata -Nevada Kara Kimashita-"
"Megami no Chikara"

"Hamaguri Bomber"
"SAKURA -Haru o Utawa Nevada-"

DVD
"Nihon no Mikata -Nevada Kara Kimashita-" Music Video
"SAKURA -Haru o Utawa Nevada-" Music Video
"Hamaguri Bomber" Music Video
"Megami no Chikara" Music Video

Soundtracks
 - April 28, 2010
"Land On The Earth"
"MIRACLE" - Yazima Beauty Salon
"Place In Your Heart" - Aisa
"Beautiful Morning"
"Amazing Angel" - 
"Blow"
"Waiting For Love" - 
"Sweet Seventeen" - Nine Mackenzie
"Jealousy"
"Sweet My Friend"
 - Yazima Beauty Salon
"Ultimate Choice"
"Half Moon" - BRIGHT
"Memories"
"Margaret Starting!"
"Naomi Run Away"
"don't cry strawberry" - Strawberry
"Cocktail for Tonight"
"Raspberry Starting!"
"Long to visit Tokyo"
"Princess SEIKO"
"Flower of Stage"
"Naomi Starting!"
"Daddy! Come Back!"
"Departure"
"Second Coming of Strawberry"
 - Yazima Beauty Salon
"My Best Friend"
"Sunshine Smile"
"Nihon no Mikata -Nevada Kara Kimashita-" - Yazima Beauty Salon
"Idol Mitai ni Utawaste" - Yazima Beauty Salon feat. Princess Seiko (Seiko Matsuda)

Film
A film titled  was released on April 29, 2010. The film describes the "history" of the band as they win a talent contest and then travel to Japan to find Margaret's husband and the girls' father . Other than the band (Takaaki Ishibashi, Noritake Kinashi, DJ Ozma), the film also stars Meisa Kuroki, Yusuke Yamamoto, Ayaka Wilson, Kazuma Sano, Dante Carver, Kanako Yanagihara, Atsushi Itō, Kaba.chan, Yutaka Mizutani, Ren Osugi, Seiko Matsuda, Fuji Television announcer Toshiyuki Makihara, among others. There were also special Hello Kitty as caricatures of the band produced for the film.

References

External links
Official website at Avex Group

Avex Group artists
Japanese pop music groups
Female impersonators
Japanese comedy musical groups
Bands with fictional stage personas